Berlin Heights may refer to:

Berlin Heights, New Jersey
Berlin Heights, Ohio